The Galway–Mayo rivalry is a Gaelic football rivalry between Irish county teams Galway and Mayo, who first played each other in 1901. It is considered to be one of the biggest rivalries in Gaelic games. Mayo's home ground is MacHale Park in Castlebar, while Galway play their home games in Salthill's Pearse Stadium or St Jarlath's Park in Tuam.

The Tribesmen have enjoyed greater success in the All-Ireland, having won nine titles to Mayo's three. The rivalry has historically been good-natured but has taken on a harder edge since the turn of the millennium, with the mood between supporters souring.

History
One of the oldest rivalries in Gaelic football, the fixture was first contested in the 1901 Championship with Mayo winning by 2-4 to 0-3 on the day. The game, which took place in Claremorris on 9 November 1902, was the first official final of the Connacht Championship. The Connacht GAA Council was founded on the same day.

Mayo were the first of the two to contest an All-Ireland final, when they faced Wexford in the 1916 final. Galway became the first to win the tournament in the 1925 Championship (though the Championship itself was not completed until 1926). The 1930s was the greatest era of dominance for the two teams; between 1932 and 1942 Galway and Mayo contested eight All-Ireland senior finals, with Galway winning titles in 1934 and 1938, and Mayo winning their maiden title in 1936. The teams were also two of the strongest teams in the country in the 1950s and 1960s, with Mayo winning in 1950 and 1951, and Galway winning in 1956, 1964, 1965 and 1966. In that era, each team regularly gave the other their toughest game of the year. Following Galway's 1966 triumph however, no Connacht team would win an All-Ireland for another 32 years.

The rivalry has historically been characterised as relatively friendly, with many Galway and Mayo players from the 1950s–60s teams having attended the same schools and players from the border areas having family ties in the other county. This is in contrast to the more bitter rivalries in the sport like Cork–Kerry or Armagh–Tyrone. The good-natured rivalry has also been attributed to the similarities between the two counties and the shared socio-economic challenges they have faced through the years. With a total of nearly 40,000 people emigrating from the two counties from 1951 to 1966, their shared success in football was considered one of the few bright spots in that era.

The friendliness of the contest has been tested in recent years however. Following defeats for Mayo in the 1996 and 1997 All-Ireland finals, Galway knocked Mayo out in the opening round of the 1998 Championship and went on to win the title. Galway, who were managed by Mayo-man John O'Mahony, also won the title in 2001. Galway's win, on the back of Mayo's two defeats and under the stewardship of a Mayo native, left a sour taste. When the team knocked Galway out of the 1999 Championship, the win was celebrated "as if it was an All-Ireland."

Mayo dominated the Connacht Championship in the early 2010s, winning five-in-a-row and inflicting a record defeat on Galway in Pearse Stadium in 2013. During this period of dominance, Mayo reached the All-Ireland finals of 2012 and 2013 but were beaten on both occasions. Their winning streak in Connacht was broken by Galway in 2016 and the Tribesmen won again when they faced each other in 2017. However, in both seasons Mayo went on to reach the All-Ireland final, while Galway were eliminated in the quarter-finals. The tension between the two teams was heightened by this level of competition, and this was reflected in the stands. Galway's All-Ireland-winning captain Ray Silke described the mood between the supporters as having "gone a little bit dark over the last while."

Senior results

Championship

References

Mayo
Mayo county football team rivalries